Musa aurantiaca is a species of wild banana (genus Musa), native to Tibet, Arunachal Pradesh, the Assam region and Myanmar.

References

auriantiaca
Flora of Tibet
Flora of East Himalaya
Flora of Assam (region)
Flora of Myanmar